The Emerald City Comic Con (ECCC), formerly the Emerald City Comicon, is an annual comic book convention taking place in Seattle, Washington. Originally taking place at the city's Qwest Field (first at West Field Plaza, then at the Event Center), the venue changed in 2008 to its current home at the Seattle Convention Center. The show expanded to a three-day event in 2011 and began using the entire convention center for the first time in 2013. In 2014, the Gaming portion of the show was moved to the third floor of the nearby Sheraton Seattle Hotel to make room for an expanded show floor.

Programming
The convention features a wide array of activities and programming including industry guests, various discussion panels, celebrity signings and photo opportunities, prize drawings, and costume contests. It features a large and lively Exhibitor's hall with comics retailers from across the entire Pacific Northwest bringing a large stock of modern and vintage comics, as well as other products such as statues, action figures, models, etc. CCG, RPG, and tabletop gaming is supported in specific areas of the convention center.

History

The event began as the Emerald City ComiCon, a one-day event at the Qwest Field Events Center in 2003. It was founded by comics retailerand comic book creator Jim Demonakos of Mukilteo, Washington, and broke even with an attendance of 3,000 people. The event was acquired by Reed Exhibitions in 2015, after it had grown into a multi-day event at the Washington State Convention Center.

On March 6, 2020, ReedPop announced that the 2020 Emerald City Comic Con would be postponed from March 12–15 to August 21–23 because of the COVID-19 pandemic, which had been spreading in the Seattle area for several weeks. The rescheduled event was later cancelled in June and was replaced by a virtual event.

In 2021, the convention resumed as an in-person event, scheduled for December 2-5, 2021.

Locations and dates

References

External links

 

Culture of Seattle
Seattle Area conventions
Comics conventions in the United States
Gaming conventions
Washington (state) culture
Festivals in Seattle
Recurring events established in 2003
2003 establishments in Washington (state)
Conventions in Washington (state)